Full Frontal is a one-man, one-act play by English writer Michael Hastings.  It premièred at the Royal Court Theatre Upstairs in 1979 with Winston Ntshona performing and Rufus Collins directing, and was revised by the author for a production at Ovalhouse in 2001.

Plot
The play is a monologue by Gabriel Nkoke - a man born in Nigeria but raised almost all his life in England, "the new type of man. I'm neither here. Nor neither there" - delivered to an unseen representative of the National Front, which Gabriel is at first seen trying to join because he agrees with their racialist agenda.

Critical reception
The play was received favourably by critics and described as "Swiftian".

Notes

References
 Plays and Players, Issue 2, Issue 26. Hansom Books, 1979.
 The Listener, Volume 101. British Broadcasting Corporation, 1979.
 Race Today. Institute of Race Relations, 1981.

1979 plays
English plays
Plays set in England
One-act plays
Monodrama
Plays about race and ethnicity